Deepam may refer to:

 Karthikai Deepam, Tamils Festival of Lights
 Diya (lamp), a type of oil lamp
 Deepam TV, a  Free to Air satellite television channel

Films 
 Amara Deepam (1956 film), a 1956 Tamil film
 Amara Deepam (1977 film), a 1977 Telugu film
 Dheepam, a 1977 Tamil film
 Deepam (film), a 1980 Malayalam film
 Karthika Deepam (film), a 1979 Telugu film

See also